Otto Perutz (27 July 1847, Teplice, Bohemia – 18 January 1922, Munich Germany) was an Austrian-German chemist.

From 1872 to 1876 Perutz was director of Bayerische Aktiengesellschaft für chemische und landwirtschaftlich-chemische Fabrikate (Bavarian Corporation for Chemical and Agrochemical Products Inc., later Süd-Chemie AG) in Munich-Heufeld.

In 1880 he founded his own firm Otto Perutz Trockenplattenfabrik in Munich. He developed a method for the industrial production of Eosin-Silver-Plates which had been invented by Hermann Wilhelm Vogel and Johann Baptist Obernetter. This was crucial to develop colour photography. In 1896 Perutz-Plates were used for radiography for the first time.

Perutz sold his firm in 1897. He was member of the supervisory board of Bayerische Aktiengesellschaft für chemische und landwirtschaftlich-chemische Fabrikate from 1902 until his death in 1922. The Perutz-Photowerke became part of Agfa in 1964.

1847 births
1922 deaths
19th-century Austrian chemists
19th-century German chemists
Photochemistry
People from Teplice
20th-century German chemists